Stevan Javellana (1918–1977) was a Filipino novelist and short story writer in the English language.  He is also known as Esteban Javellana.

Biography
Javellana was born in 1918 in Iloilo. He fought as a guerrilla during the Japanese invasion of the Philippines. After World War II, he graduated from the University of the Philippines College of Law in 1948, and practiced law for several years. He stayed in the United States  afterwards but he died in the Visayas in 1977 at the age of 59.

Writing career
Javellana was the author of a best-selling war novel in the United States and Manila, Without Seeing the Dawn, published by Little, Brown and Company in Boston in 1947.  His short stories were published in the Manila Times Magazine in the 1950s, among which are Two Tickets to Manila, The Sin of Father Anselmo, Sleeping Tablets, The Fifth Man,  The Tree of Peace and Transition.  Without Seeing the Dawn, also known as The Lost Ones, is his only novel. The novel is also a requirement for the Grade 7 students of the University of the Philippines Rural High School.

References

See also
Javellana, a family from the Philippines.
Philippine literature in English
Literature of the Philippines
Philippine English

Writers from Iloilo
University of the Philippines alumni
20th-century Filipino lawyers
Paramilitary Filipinos
1918 births
1977 deaths
Filipino novelists
Filipino male short story writers
Filipino short story writers
20th-century novelists
20th-century short story writers
Visayan people
20th-century male writers